Abu Marwan Bishr ibn Marwan ibn al-Hakam (–694) was an Umayyad prince and governor of Iraq during the reign of his brother, Caliph Abd al-Malik. Bishr fought at Marj Rahit with his father, Caliph Marwan I. Marwan posted Bishr to Egypt to keep his brother Abd al-Aziz company. In 690/91, Bishr was made governor of Kufa and about one year later, Basra was added to his governorship, giving him full control of Iraq.

During his governorship of Iraq, Bishr was known to be highly accessible and relatively merciful. Fond of poetry, he had many Arab poets, including Jarir, al-Farazdaq and al-Ra'i, in his entourage and was elegized in many panegyrics. He eliminated the remaining partisans of Mus'ab ibn al-Zubayr in Basra and was officially in command of the war effort against Kharijite rebels in the province. However, he was forced to hand over command of the Iraqi army to al-Muhallab ibn Abi Sufra. He died in office of an unknown illness and was buried in Basra.

Early life and career
Bishr's father was Marwan ibn al-Hakam of the Banu Umayya (Umayyads) and his mother was Qutayya bint Bishr, who hailed from the aristocratic clan of the Banu Kilab, the Banu Ja'far. Bishr killed a chieftain of the Banu Kilab during the Battle of Marj Rahit in 684. The Umayyad victory at Marj Rahit against the supporters of the rival Mecca-based caliph Abd Allah ibn al-Zubayr consolidated Marwan's caliphate in Syria.

Bishr accompanied Marwan when he wrested Egypt from its Zubayrid governor, Abd al-Rahman ibn Utba al-Fihri, by early 685.  Marwan appointed another of his sons, Abd al-Aziz, governor of Egypt and had Bishr remain in the province to keep Abd al-Aziz company as the latter was posted far from the rest of his kinsmen in Syria. Relations between the brothers may have become tense, prompting Bishr to return to Syria. By then, the caliphal throne had passed to another son of Marwan, Abd al-Malik. Bishr's activities in Syria upon his return are not specified by the literary sources, though an originally Byzantine bronze weight chiseled and re-inscribed with the Kufic Arabic inscription: "In the name of God: Bishr ibn Marwan, the amir; this is a weight of twelve" was likely produced in Syria. According to the numismatist George C. Miles, the bronze weight indicates that Bishr occupied a government office in Syria, whether as a local governor or a controller of finance.

Governor of Iraq
According to the 8th-century historian al-Waqidi, Abd al-Malik appointed Bishr governor of Kufa, one of the two main Arab garrison centers of Iraq, in 690/91, while Iraq was still under the control of the Zubayrids. According to the modern historian Luke Treadwell, Bishr may have been promised the governorship by Abd al-Malik in return for his participation in the upcoming campaign against Zubayrid Iraq. Bishr took part in the 691 campaign which ended with the defeat and death of Iraq's ruler Mus'ab ibn al-Zubayr and Bishr taking up his office by 691/92. He returned to Syria at least once, in April 693, to visit his Damascus property. Amid the Qays–Yaman tribal conflict, Bishr patronized and encouraged the Banu Fazara (part of the Qays) to launch a retaliatory assault against the Banu Kalb (part of the Yaman) in 693.

Bishr's advisers in Kufa were Rawh ibn Zinba al-Judhami, the senior aide of Abd al-Malik, and Musa ibn Nusayr, a client of Abd al-Aziz and future conqueror of the Iberian Peninsula. By 692/93, Abd al-Malik transferred the governorship of Basra to Bishr after its governor, Khalid ibn Abdallah ibn Khalid ibn Asid, failed to put down a Kharijite revolt. At the end of 693, Bishr relocated to Basra, assigning as his deputy to Kufa the veteran Kufan statesman Amr ibn Hurayth al-Makhzumi. Bishr formed a consultative council representing three key groups to help him govern Iraq: the Syrians sent by Abd al-Malik, namely Rawh ibn Zinba and Musa ibn Nusayr; two prominent local nobles, Ikrima ibn Rabi'a and Khalid ibn Attab al-Riyahi; and religious scholars, such as Amir al-Sha'bi. Despite being made the lead amir (commander) on the Kharijite front, Bishr was ordered by Abd al-Malik to give al-Muhallab ibn Abi Sufra command over the army. Bishr opposed the move, as he intended to appoint Umar ibn Ubayd Allah ibn Ma'mar to lead the war effort, but ultimately demurred. However, he still caused problems for al-Muhallab by persuading his deputy in Kufa to withhold cooperation with the commander.

Death
Bishr had contended with an unknown illness or infection from the time of his arrival in Basra. A few months later, he died in his mid-forties. He was buried in Basra, but within days his grave had become indistinguishable from the grave of a certain African who had died on the same day. Some soldiers in al-Muhallab's army defected upon hearing news of Bishr's death. Abd al-Malik appointed al-Hajjaj ibn Yusuf to replace Bishr as governor of Iraq, i.e. the combined provinces of Kufa and Basra.

Assessment
According to Orientalist Laura Veccia Vaglieri, "Bishr was a very agreeable young man, a governor who could be approached without difficulty, remarkably inclined to be merciful", but nonetheless responsible for the executions of Mus'ab's partisans who continued dissident activities in Basra. Bishr was criticized for certain ritual innovations and neglecting to distribute food to his subjects, a task which he entrusted to his shurṭa and court.

Bishr, like many of his kinsmen, drank wine and led a festive life with his friends. Some of these friends helped Bishr rid himself of the overarching presence of Rawh ibn Zinba by trickery. Bishr was fond of music and poetry, and was celebrated in panegyrics by numerous poets, including al-Farazdaq. Other poets under his patronage included Jarir, Kuthayyir Azza, Suraka ibn Mirdas al-Bariqi, Nusayb, al-Ra'i, Ka'b al-Ashqari, Ibn al-Zabir and al-Uqayshir al-Asadi. Bishr was well known for instigating poetic duels between Jarir and al-Akhtal. One poet who opposed Bishr was the pro-Zubayrid Kilabi chieftain, Zufar ibn al-Harith, who castigated the Umayyad prince in verse.

Marriages and descendants
Bishr was married to Umm Hakim bint Muhammad ibn Umara, a great-granddaughter of Uqba ibn Abi Mu'ayt, a member of the Umayyad clan; Umm Kulthum al-Kubra bint Abi Salama, a granddaughter of Abd al-Rahman ibn Awf of the Zuhra clan of the Quraysh, with whom he had a son, al-Hakam; and Hind bint Asma of the Banu Fazara tribe. 

Bishr's son Abd al-Malik was appointed the deputy governor of Basra by his cousin, the governor of Iraq Maslama ibn Abd al-Malik, in 720, but was dismissed that year by Maslama's successor Umar ibn Hubayra al-Fazari. In 740, Abd al-Malik provided safe haven to Yahya, the son of Zayd ibn Ali, from the governor Yusuf ibn Umar al-Thaqafi in the aftermath of Zayd's abortive revolt against the Umayyads until Yahya could flee for Khurasan. Abd al-Malik was executed by the Abbasid dynasty in 750 after the toppling of the Umayyads. 

Abd al-Malik ibn Bishr's son Bishr moved to al-Andalus (the Iberian Peninsula) shortly after the establishment of the Umayyad emirate there by his distant cousin, the grandson of Caliph Hisham ibn Abd al-Malik Abd al-Rahman I ibn Mu'awiya, in 756, and became a close adviser of Abd al-Rahman. He was credited by the historians Ibn Sa'id al-Maghribi (d. 1286) and al-Maqqari (d. 1632) for advising Abd al-Rahman to use Berber mawali (Muslim freedmen, clients) and enlist non-Muslim slaves to neutralize the strong influence of the Arab tribes in the emirate. Bishr ibn Abd al-Malik's son Abd al-Malik was also a member of the Umayyad nobility in al-Andalus, and was married to a niece of the last Syria-based Umayyad caliph, Marwan II.

References

Bibliography

694 deaths
Sons of Umayyad caliphs
Umayyad governors of Iraq
Umayyad governors of Kufa
7th-century Arabs